Azmi may refer to:

Given name

Arab people
 Azmi Bishara (born 1956), Arab politician
 Azmi Mikati (born 1972), Lebanese businessman
 Azmi Nassar (1957–2007), Israeli football manager
 Jabir Al-Azmi, Kuwaiti MP
 Khalil Azmi (born 1964), retired Moroccan footballer
 Marzouq AlـHubaini Al-Azmi, Kuwaiti MP
 Mikhled Al-Azmi, Kuwaiti politician
 Najib Azmi Mikati (born 1955), Lebanese former PM
 Saad Madhi Saad Howash Al Azmi (born 1979), Kuwaiti citizen
 Zakaria Azmi (born 1938), Egyptian politician

Malay people
 Amirul Adli Azmi (born 1996), Singaporean football player
 Azi Shahril Azmi (born 1985), Malaysian football player
 Azmi Khalid (born 1940), Malaysian politician
 Azmi Mahmud (born 1967), retired Malaysian goalkeeper
 Azmi Mohamed (born 1966), Malaysian football manager
 Azmizi Azmi (born 1986), Malaysian football defender
 Azrul Azmi (born 1988), Malaysian football defender
 Hafiq Azmi (born 1996), Malaysian racer
 Mohd Afiq Azmi (born 1989), Malaysian footballer
 Mohamed Azmi Mohamed, President of Malaysian Court
 Mohd Azmi Muslim (born 1986), Malaysian football midfielder
 Zaki Azmi (born 1945), Malaysian former chief of justice
 Zubir Azmi (born 1991), Malaysian footballer

Other people
 Aishah Azmi, British citizen, claimant in Azmi v Kirklees Metropolitan BC
 Azmi Turgut (born 1988), Turkish basketball player
 Cemal Azmi (1868–1922), former Trabzon governor

Surname
The surname is often adopted by people from the city of Azamgarh, Uttar Pradesh, India.
 Abdul Haq Azmi (1928–2016), Indian Islamic scholar, cousin-uncle of Rana Ayyub
 Abdul Lateef Azmi (1917–2002), Indian Urdu writer
 Abu Asim Azmi (born 1955), Indian politician
 Ahmad Ali Barqi Azmi (born 1954), Indian radio announcer
 Ayesha Takia Azmi (born 1986), Indian actress
 Azizullah Azmi (1929–2010), Indian politician, MP of Lok Sabha
 Baba Azmi, Indian cinematographer
 Mohammed Badi Uzzaman Azmi (1939–2011), Pakistani actor
 Habib al-Rahman al-'Azmi (1901-1992), Indian Islamic scholar of hadith and fiqh 
 Iliyas Azmi (born 1934), Indian politician
 Kaifi Azmi (1919–2002), Indian Urdu poet
 Khaleel-Ur-Rehman Azmi (1927–1978), Indian Urdu poet
 Mushtaq Ahmed Azmi (1919–2011), UNESCO official from India
 Muhammad Mustafa Azmi (1930–2017), Indian Islamic scholar of hadith
 Obaidullah Khan Azmi (born 1949), Indian politician, member of Rajya Sabha from Madhya Pradesh
 Qamaruzzaman Azmi (born 1946), Indian Islamic scholar
 Saeed-ur-Rahman Azmi Nadvi (born 1934), Indian Islamic scholar
 Seema Azmi, Indian actress
 Shabana Azmi (born 1950), Indian film actress
 Shahid Azmi (1977–2010), Indian solicitor
 Shaikh Shamim Ahmed Azmi (1938–2019), Indian politician from Maharashtra
 Shakeel Azmi (born 1971), Indian poet
 Tanvi Azmi, Indian film and television actress
 Waqar Azmi, UK Prime Minister's Chief Diversity Adviser

Arabic masculine given names
Malaysian masculine given names
Turkish masculine given names
Toponymic surnames
Indian surnames
Urdu-language surnames
Nisbas
People from Azamgarh